In molecular biology, U24 is a member of the C/D class of snoRNA which contain the C (UGAUGA) and D (CUGA) box motifs. C/D box snoRNAs have been shown to act as methylation guides for a number of RNA targets. U24 is encoded within an intron of the gene for ribosomal protein L7a in mammals, chicken and Fugu. The U76/SNORD76 snoRNA is found in an intron of the uRNA host gene (UHG) growth arrest specific 5 (GAS5) transcript gene. snoRNAs Z20 and U76 snoRNAs show clear similarity to U24.

An experiment that looked at 22 different non-small-cell lung cancer tissues found that SNORD33, SNORD66 and SNORD76 were over-expressed relative to matched noncancerous lung tissues.

References

External links 
 

Small nuclear RNA